Jörg Kühn (1940–1964) was a Swiss artist, naturalist and scientific illustrator who specialized in bird paintings and drawings. He was also a children's book illustrator. He is noted for illustrations that are of a particularly scientific and exact nature.

Biography

Kühn's reputation as a master of the exact portrayal of animals is based on a professional career that lasted barely six years during which he worked prolifically. The legacy is regarded as very valuable containing in excess of one hundred colour plates and several hundred line drawings and innumerable field studies of the animals he was illustrating. His depictive style has echoes of Louis Agassiz Fuertes

He worked from 1961 to 1964 as a scientific illustrator at the Zoological Museum (Zoologische Museum der Universitat Zürich). His work which appeared in scientific publications including  Pro Natura, Pro Juventute, World Wildlife Fund, and Hallwag-Verlag are exact and beautifully drawn. He was also skilled in graphics and taught the skill at the Zoological Museum in Zürich.

As well as scientific publications, he was sometimes employed as an illustrator of books including the children's book Der Wald Und Seine Tierre (The Forest and its Animals) (1963) where his illustrations included monographs of forest animals. It has run to at least five editions since it was first published in 1963.His colour plates include those of threatened wildlife that were commissioned by the World Wildlife Fund and contributions to the Handbuch der Vögel Mitteleuropas (Handbook of the Birds of Central Europe).

Although Jörg Kühn's is chiefly remembered as a wildlife illustrator he was also commissioned to illustrate a number of medical textbooks including  for the Surgery of the Thyroid and Parathyroid Glands 

Kühn died in Zürich in October 1964 aged 24 from Hodgkin's lymphoma diagnosed when he was 18 years of age.

Selected solo exhibitions 

 2009 Landshut Utrenstorf Castle, Zürich –  fifty works were shown

See also
List of wildlife artists

References

20th-century Swiss painters
Swiss male painters
Scientific illustrators
1940 births
1964 deaths
Swiss bird artists
20th-century Swiss male artists